Albert Bates (born 1947) is influential figure in the intentional community and ecovillage movements.

Albert Bates may also refer to:

 Albert Bates (cricketer) (1867–1950), New Zealand cricketer
 Albert Bates (criminal) (1891–1948), American bank robber and burglar
 Albert Carlos Bates (1865–1954), American librarian, book collector, and historian
 Albert Edmund Bates (1862–1929), Australian architect